Baranovka is a rural locality (a selo) in Kalininsky Selsoviet of Volodarsky District, Astrakhan Oblast, Russia. The population was 193 as of 2010. There is 1 street.

Geography 
Baranovka is located 20 km southeast of Volodarsky (the district's administrative centre) by road. Lebyazhye is the nearest rural locality.

References 

Rural localities in Volodarsky District, Astrakhan Oblast